University of Tartu Botanical Garden, is a botanical garden in Tartu, Estonia. It belongs to the University of Tartu.

The Garden was established in 1803. Originally, it was located at Vanemuise street near what is now the Vanemuine Small Theatre House. In 1806, the garden was relocated to a more suitable site, on a former bastion at Lai street on the northern side of the old town.

Gallery

See also
 Tallinn Botanic Garden

References

External links

 Official website
 Botanical Garden of Tartu University at BGCI

Botanical gardens in Estonia
Botanical Garden
1800s establishments in Estonia
1803 establishments in the Russian Empire
Tourist attractions in Tartu